Pethia yuensis is a species of cyprinid fish found in rivers in Manipur, India.  It can grow to a length of  SL.

References 

Pethia
Barbs (fish)
Fish described in 2003